Jagacha or Jagachha is a neighborhood in Howrah, located in Howrah district of West Bengal, India. It is a part of the area covered by Kolkata Metropolitan Development Authority (KMDA).

Jagacha is under the jurisdiction of Jagacha Police Station of Howrah City Police.

Geography
It is adjacent to Ramrajatala and Santragachi.

Locality
Government of India Press, Santragachi as well as a massive residential complex of central government employees popularly known as Press Quarter is located in Jagacha.

Railway quarters in formal Anglo Indian Colony Sahebpara is a place of interest.

Jagacha Shakti Sangha is a major local organisation with many facilities for local youth that organizes various events throughout the year.

Jagacha was a hub of iron and small engineering industry which has lost its glory.

Education
The medium of instruction is Bengali, English or Hindi. There are many schools in Jagacha: Jagacha High School, Satashi High School(H.S),Kendriya Vidyalaya Santragachi, Jagacha Girls High School. There is a Computer Training School Jagacha Smile Welfare Society Vocational Training Institute for Computer and Soft Skill (Central Gov. Recognize (NCVT)) at Jagacha Arabindo Sangha.

Transport
Santragachi Junction and Ramrajatala railway station on the South Eastern line (Kolkata Suburban Railway) connects the town to Howrah Station and other suburban areas of Howrah district.

References

Cities and towns in Howrah district
Neighbourhoods in Howrah
Kolkata Metropolitan Area